Maurice Jean Marie Boudin de Launay de Tromelin (Morlaix, 21 February 1740 – 1825) was a French Navy officer.

Biography 
Born to Marie-Françoise Le Diouguel de Penanru and Jacques Boudin de Tromelin, Tromelin-Lanuguy joined the Navy in 1756.

He served as first officer on Ardent under Charles de Bernard de Marigny, taking part in the Battle of the Chesapeake on 5 September 1781. This earned him status as a founding member of the Society of the Cincinnati. He was also a member of the Académie de Marine.

In 1792, during the French Revolution, he emigrated to England and joined the Armée des Princes.

At the Bourbon Restauration, he was made a Knight in the Order of Saint Louis. He eventually retired with the rank of Rear-Admiral.

See also 
 Bernard-Marie Boudin de Tromelin (1735–1815), brother to Tromelin-Launay
 Jacques Marie Boudin de Tromelin de La Nuguy (1751–1798), brother to Tromelin-Launay

Sources and references 
References

 Bibliography
 

1740 births
1825 deaths
French Navy officers